Godfrey John Bewicke-Copley, 7th Baron Cromwell (born 4 March 1960), is a British hereditary peer and member of the House of Lords, sitting as a crossbencher.

He was educated at Eton College and Selwyn College, Cambridge.

Prior to the House of Lords Act 1999, which removed all but 92 excepted hereditary peers from the house, he was an active member of the House of Lords. Lord Cromwell lost his seat due to the Act.

On 9 April 2014, he was elected to sit in the House of Lords at a crossbench hereditary peers' by-election, now making him one of the 92 excepted hereditary peers. He sits in the Lords as Lord Cromwell.

Coat of arms

References

External links
Parliament's official website profile for Lord Cromwell

1960 births
Living people
Politicians from Leicestershire
People educated at Eton College
Alumni of Selwyn College, Cambridge
Crossbench hereditary peers
Barons Cromwell

Cromwell
Cromwell